José Luis Rebollo (born 8 October 1972) is a Spanish racing cyclist. He rode in the 1999 Tour de France.

References

External links
 

1972 births
Living people
Spanish male cyclists
Place of birth missing (living people)
Cyclists from Madrid